The Penguin Islands are a cluster of islands and sea stacks located on the south coast of the island of Newfoundland in the province of Newfoundland and Labrador. The islands are located nearly 20 kilometers from the nearest part of the island of Newfoundland.

See also
 Geography of Newfoundland and Labrador

Islands of Newfoundland and Labrador